Nello Russo (born 11 May 1981) is a former Italian footballer who played as a forward.

Football career
In 2000, he left on loan to Arezzo along with Giuseppe Ticli, Giovanni Passiglia and Cristian Lizzori, from Internazionale.

Russo was sold to Lumezzane in a co-ownership deal during the summer of 2003, after a successful loan. He was loaned to Crotone in the second half of 2004/05 season, and Crotone choose to buy him from Lumezzane, for €300,000. However, since his purchase, he has been loaned out to AlbinoLeffe, Spezia, Pescara and Padova in January 2008.

In summer 2007 Crotone got full ownership of the player for free. In August 2009 he left for Monza.

Honours
Crotone
Lega Pro Prima Divisione Promotion Playoffs Winner: 2009

References

External links
archivio.inter.it
acspezia.com 

Profile at FIGC 

Italian footballers
Italy youth international footballers
Inter Milan players
Calcio Lecco 1912 players
S.S. Arezzo players
U.C. AlbinoLeffe players
Spezia Calcio players
Delfino Pescara 1936 players
Calcio Padova players
F.C. Lumezzane V.G.Z. A.S.D. players
F.C. Crotone players
A.C. Monza players
Serie A players
Serie B players
Serie C players
Association football forwards
Sportspeople from the Metropolitan City of Milan
1981 births
Living people
Footballers from Lombardy